The Türk Telecom İzmir Cup is a professional tennis tournament played on outdoor hard courts. It is currently part of the ATP Challenger Tour. It has been held annually at the UTEM Tennis Club in İzmir, Turkey, since 2008.

Past finals

Singles

Doubles

References
ITF search

 
ATP Challenger Tour
Hard court tennis tournaments
Tennis tournaments in Turkey
Sports competitions in Izmir